The Reeves Mound is a Native American mound in the southeastern part of the U.S. state of Ohio.  Located north of the unincorporated community of Alfred, the mound is part of an archaeological site that appears to have been built by peoples of the Adena culture.

The fields around the mound have yielded stone chips and projectile points that are characteristic of the Adena culture. Among these points is one of the distinctive form known as a "bird point".

It appears that the Adena used the mound and its surrounding area for hundreds of years; some of the points are typical of the early years of the Adena culture, which dates from circa 1000 BC, while others appear to date from the culture's late period, circa 400 AD.

In recognition of its archaeological value, the Reeves Mound was listed on the National Register of Historic Places in 1974. The Mound Cemetery Mound near Chester to the south, also in Meigs County, is also listed on the NRHP.

References

Adena culture
Archaeological sites on the National Register of Historic Places in Ohio
Geography of Meigs County, Ohio
National Register of Historic Places in Meigs County, Ohio
Mounds in Ohio